Irina Embrich, née Zamkovaja (born 12 July 1980) is an Estonian left-handed épée fencer. Embrich is a two-time team European champion and 2017 team world champion. A two-time Olympian, Embrich is a 2021 team Olympic champion.

Embrich competed in the 2016 Rio de Janeiro Olympic Games and the 2020 Tokyo Olympic Games.

Biography
Embrich's first sport was gymnastics, but she resented the hard discipline of the Soviet era. She later took to rhythmic gymnastics and then fencing under coach Samuil Kaminski. She ranked 20th then 12th at the cadet World championships in 1996 and 1998, but snatched the bronze medal at the junior event in 1999.

After high school, Embrich studied chemistry at the Tallinn University of Technology. In 2004 her coach left Estonia for Norway. Épée champion Nikolai Novosjolov, who is the same age as her, accepted to train her under an equal footing more than a student-master relationship. The same year she married a fellow student and gave birth in 2005 to a daughter, Maria. She went on in her fencing career and won the silver medal at the épée 2006 World Fencing Championships after losing the final 15–11 versus Tímea Nagy, and then the bronze medal in 2007. She was named Estonian Sportswoman of the Year 2007 for these performances.

In the 2012–13 season, she took a bronze medal at the World Cup events of Leipzig and Saint-Maur and won the team gold medal with Estonia in the European Championships in Zagreb. She ranked 10th in the World Championships in Budapest after she lost her T16 bout against Emese Szász, who eventually took a bronze medal.

In the 2013–14 season, she placed second at the Budapest Grand Prix after being defeated 7–15 in the final by world no.1 Ana Maria Brânză. This result helped her reach the 4th place in world rankings. At the 2014 European Championships at Strasbourg, she was stopped in the table of 32 by World No. 1 Emese Szász. In the team event, Estonia were defeated by Russia in the semi-final, then by Italy and finished fourth. At the 2014 World Championships in Kazan, Embrich reached the quarter-finals, defeating World No. 2 Ana Brânză along the way. She was then defeated by Italy's Rossella Fiamingo, who eventually won the gold medal.

Medal record

Olympic Games

World Championship

European Championship

Grand Prix

World Cup

References

External links

1980 births
Living people
Sportspeople from Tallinn
Estonian female épée fencers
Fencers at the 2015 European Games
European Games medalists in fencing
European Games silver medalists for Estonia
Olympic fencers of Estonia
Fencers at the 2016 Summer Olympics
Universiade medalists in fencing
Universiade bronze medalists for Estonia
Recipients of the Order of the White Star, 3rd Class
Medalists at the 2005 Summer Universiade
Olympic medalists in fencing
Medalists at the 2020 Summer Olympics
Olympic gold medalists for Estonia
Fencers at the 2020 Summer Olympics
20th-century Estonian women
21st-century Estonian women